Communauté d'agglomération du Grand Dole is the communauté d'agglomération, an intercommunal structure, centred on the town of Dole. It is located in the Jura department, in the Bourgogne-Franche-Comté region, eastern France. Created in 2008, its seat is in Dole. Its area is 424.4 km2. Its population was 54,626 in 2019, of which 23,711 in Dole proper.

Composition
The communauté d'agglomération consists of the following 47 communes:

Abergement-la-Ronce
Amange
Archelange
Audelange
Aumur
Authume
Auxange
Baverans
Biarne
Brevans
Champagney
Champdivers
Champvans
Châtenois
Chevigny
Choisey
Crissey
Damparis
Le Deschaux
Dole
Éclans-Nenon
Falletans
Foucherans
Frasne-les-Meulières
Gevry
Gredisans
Jouhe
Lavangeot
Lavans-lès-Dole
Malange
Menotey
Moissey
Monnières
Nevy-lès-Dole
Parcey
Peintre
Peseux
Pointre
Rainans
Rochefort-sur-Nenon
Romange
Saint-Aubin
Sampans
Tavaux
Villers-Robert
Villette-lès-Dole
Vriange

References

Dole
Dole